International Desk (also referred to as the I-Desk) was a news program on CNN International. It delivered a round-up of the day's events. The show acts as a late night programme for Asia, an afternoon broadcast in Europe and a mid-morning news programme for the Americas. I-Desk airs live weekdays during the 10am hour (ET) from CNN Center in Atlanta.

The show was launched in 2009 as part of a slate of new programming for primetime in Europe. Gorani was initially the sole anchor when I-Desk premiered on 9 February 2009, with the program airing once a day. Isha Sesay later joined on 20 April 2009 to host the 10:00 ET edition, with Gorani hosting a second block two hours later. Sesay swapped roles with Holmes in September 2011, taking over as presenter of BackStory, while Holmes took over at I-Desk.

Since 2014 Robyn Curnow was the regular anchor of the show. It aired once a day again at 10:00 a.m.. In 2019, due to the expansion of Connect the World with Becky Anderson, the International Desk was cancelled with Curnow taking the weekend Asia-Pacific morning news slot from 6:00 - 8:00 p.m. ET on Fridays, 2:00 p.m. and 4:00 p.m. ET slot on Saturdays, and 5:00 - 8:00 p.m. ET slot on Sundays.

References

External links
Official site

CNN original programming
English-language television shows